The 2015–16 American Eagles women's basketball team represented American University during the 2015–16 NCAA Division I women's basketball season. The Eagles, led by third year head coach Megan Gebbia, played their home games at Bender Arena and were members of the Patriot League. They finished the season 8–23, 5–13 in Patriot League play to finish in seventh place. They advanced to the quarterfinals of the Patriot League women's tournament where they lost to Bucknell.

Roster

Schedule

|-
!colspan=9 style="background:#0000FF; color:#CC0000;"| Non-conference regular season

|-
!colspan=9 style="background:#0000FF; color:#CC0000;"| Patriot League regular season

|-
!colspan=9 style="background:#0000FF; color:#CC0000;"| Patriot League Women's Tournament

See also
 2015–16 American Eagles men's basketball team

References

American
American Eagles women's basketball seasons
American Eagles women's basketball
American Eagles women's basketball